Pycnanthus may refer to:
Pycnanthus (sea anemone), genus of sea anemones in the family Actinostolidae
Pycnanthus (plant), genus of plants in the nutmeg (Myristicaceae) family